Mechanical Bull is the sixth studio album by American rock band Kings of Leon, released in Ireland, Germany, Sweden and Australia on September 20, 2013, in the United Kingdom on September 23, 2013, and in North America on September 24, 2013 by RCA Records. In late 2013 the album received a nomination at the 56th Grammy Awards for Best Rock Album.

Reception

Mechanical Bull received generally positive reviews from critics. At Metacritic, the album has a weighted averagescore of 70 out of 100 based on 30 reviews, indicating "generally favorable reviews".

The album debuted at No. 2 on the Billboard 200, based on 110,000 copies sold in its first week. It has sold 347,000 copies in the United States as of August 2016. In the United Kingdom, the album debuted at No. 1 on the Official Albums Chart, selling 71,000 copies in the first week. The album has sold 323,240 copies in the UK as of October 2016. Mechanical Bull is the first Kings of Leon album that sold more copies in the United States than in the UK.

Promotion
The first single to promote the album, "Supersoaker", was released on July 17, 2013. This single was followed by the release of the second single titled "Wait for Me" on August 6, 2013. During the Heineken Open'er Festival 2013, Kings of Leon performed "Don't Matter", another song from this album. The third single "Temple" impacted US active rock and adult album alternative (triple A) radio on October 14, 2013 and modern rock radio on October 15, 2013. The band released the Official Video for "Beautiful War" on November 22, 2013. The song has been described by the Guardian as "a slow-grower about love and fighting," and a "distant cousin of U2's With or Without You". "Beautiful War" and "Don't Matter" were released as singles exclusively in the United Kingdom on December 9, 2013 and June 16, 2014 respectively. "Family Tree" was sent to US modern rock radio as the album's sixth overall single on June 17, 2014. An adult album alternative release followed on July 1, 2014.

To promote the album, on September 24, 2013, the band appeared on Good Morning America and performed "Supersoaker". They have also performed "Temple" on Jimmy Kimmel Live!, Late Night with Jimmy Fallon and Saturday Night Live.

Singles
"Supersoaker" reached to number 2 on the US Adult Alternative Songs chart and number 9 on the US Alternative chart. The song also peaked at number 1 on the Canada Rock chart.

"Wait for Me" reached to number 14 on the US Hot Rock Songs chart and number 10 on the US Adult Alternative Songs chart. Five days after being released in the UK, it debut at number 31 on the UK Singles Chart.

"Temple" peaked at number 1 on the Canada Rock chart.

Track listing

Personnel
Kings of Leon
 Caleb Followill – lead vocals, rhythm guitar
 Matthew Followill – lead guitar, piano, lap steel guitar, sitar, vocals
 Jared Followill – bass guitar, synthesizer, vocals
 Nathan Followill – drums, percussion, vocals

Technical personnel
 Angelo Petraglia – producer
 Ted Jensen - Mastering engineer

Charts and certifications

Weekly charts

Year-end charts

Certifications

Release history

References

2013 albums
Kings of Leon albums
RCA Records albums